Robert Rooke House is a historic home located in West Vincent Township, Chester County, Pennsylvania.  The house is in two section.  The original section is a -story, fieldstone structure, two bays by one bay. The original structure later became the kitchen wing. It was expanded about 1841, with a three-story, five-bay by two-bay, fieldstone structure.  It has a gable roof and is in a transitional Georgian / Victorian style.

It was added to the National Register of Historic Places in 1973.

References

Houses on the National Register of Historic Places in Pennsylvania
Georgian architecture in Pennsylvania
Houses completed in 1841
Houses in Chester County, Pennsylvania
National Register of Historic Places in Chester County, Pennsylvania